The 1997–1998 season was the 119th season in Bolton Wanderers F.C.'s existence, and their first season back in the Premier League after winning the Football League First Division the previous season. It covers the period from 1 July 1997 to 30 June 1998. After 102 years playing at Burnden Park, the club had moved to the new Reebok Stadium.

Season summary
In their new 27,000-seat stadium, Bolton Wanderers began the season as the strongest-looking of the newly promoted side, particularly after paying a club record fee of £3.5 million for Wimbledon striker Dean Holdsworth and holding Manchester United to a 0–0 draw. But it was a season-long struggle for Colin Todd and his men, who lost their battle on the final day of the season and occupied the final relegation place – on goal difference – to complete a hat-trick of newly promoted clubs suffering relegation. Controversially Bolton had a goal against Everton disallowed in the belief that the ball had not crossed the line after crashing down off the Everton crossbar. Television replays showed the ball had indeed crossed the line. The game finished goal-less and the two sides finished level on points with Everton surviving on their superior goal difference. Bolton fans complained bitterly that the goal and resulting 1–0 win would have kept them in the Premier League at Everton's expense. Everton fans countered by pointing to Bolton's inability to hold onto a lead during the season while Everton had a good record of coming from behind to draw or even win against their fellow strugglers. With an hour to play it is impossible to say with any degree of confidence that Bolton would indeed have been able to hold on to their goal lead.

Final league table

Results summary

Results by round

Results

FA Premier League

FA Cup

Coca-Cola Cup

Transfers

Transfers in

Transfers out

Loans in

Loans out

Appearances
Bolton used a total of 29 players during the season.

Top scorers

References

 

Bolton Wanderers F.C. seasons
Bolton Wanderers